Danesh Ramdhanie (born 12 December 1966) is a Trinidad and Tobago cricket umpire. He has stood in matches in the 2016–17 Regional Four Day Competition and the 2016–17 Regional Super50.

In December 2014, he was one of the on-field umpires for the 2014–15 Regional Four Day Competition fixture between Jamaica and the Leeward Islands where the wrong ball was used after the tea break on day three of the match. The West Indies Cricket Board named him as one of the umpires for the 2016 Caribbean Premier League tournament.

References

1966 births
Living people
Trinidad and Tobago cricket umpires